A Caprice of Pompadour (French: Un caprice de la Pompadour) is a 1931 French historical musical film directed by Joë Hamman and Willi Wolff and starring André Baugé, Marcelle Denya and Gaston Dupray. A separate German version Madame Pompadour was also made. It marked the film debut of the future star Suzy Delair.

Cast
 André Baugé as Gaston de Méville 
 Marcelle Denya as La marquise de Pompadour 
 Gaston Dupray as Le marquis de l'Espinglette 
 Paulette Duvernet as Madeleine Biron 
 René Marjolle as Le roi Louis XV 
 André Marnay as Maurepas 
 Madyne Coquelet as Madame de l'Estrade 
 Jean Rousselière as Marcel de Clermont 
 Fernand Baer as Le baron Cerf 
 Max Réjean as Un cadet 
 Jacques Christiany as Le dauphin 
 Suzy Delair as Une soubrette de la Pompadour 
 Pierre Léaud
 Théo Tony

References

Bibliography 
 Bock, Hans-Michael & Bergfelder, Tim. The Concise Cinegraph: Encyclopaedia of German Cinema. Berghahn Books, 2009.
 Dayna Oscherwitz & MaryEllen Higgins. The A to Z of French Cinema. Scarecrow Press, 2009.

External links 
 

1931 films
French historical musical films
1930s historical musical films
1930s French-language films
Films directed by Willi Wolff
Films set in the 18th century
Operetta films
French multilingual films
Cultural depictions of Louis XV
Cultural depictions of Madame de Pompadour
French black-and-white films
1931 multilingual films
Films scored by Eduard Künneke
1930s French films